A lobster trap or lobster pot is a portable trap that traps lobsters or crayfish and is used in lobster fishing. In Scotland (chiefly in the north), the word creel is used to refer to a device used to catch lobsters and other crustaceans. A lobster trap can hold several lobsters. Lobster traps can be constructed of wire and wood, or metal and netting or rigid plastic. An opening permits the lobster to enter a tunnel of netting or other one-way device. Pots are sometimes constructed in two parts, called the "chamber" or "kitchen", where there is bait, and exits into the "parlour", which prevents escape. Lobster pots are usually dropped to the sea floor, one or more at a time, sometimes up to 40 or more, and are marked by a buoy so they can be picked up later.

Description
The trap can consist of a wood frame surrounded by  mesh. The majority of the newer traps found in the Northeast of the US and the Canadian Maritimes consist of a plastic-coated metal frame. A piece of bait, often fish or chum, is placed inside the trap, and the traps are dropped onto the sea floor.  A long rope is attached to each trap, at the end of which is a plastic or styrofoam buoy that bears the owner's license number. The entrances to the traps are designed to be one-way entrances only. The traps are checked every other day by the fisherman and rebaited if necessary. One study indicated that lobster traps are very inefficient and allow almost all lobsters to escape.  Automatic rebaiting improves efficiency.

History

The lobster trap was invented in 1808 by Ebenezer Thorndike of Swampscott, Massachusetts. By 1810, the wooden lath trap is said to have originated in Cape Cod, Massachusetts.  New England fishermen in the United States used it for years before American companies introduced it to the Canadian fishery through their Atlantic coast canneries.

An 1899 report by the United States Fish Commission on the Lobster Fishery Of Maine, described the local "lath pots" used by Maine lobster fishers:

Safety
Lobster fishermen who become entangled in the trap line are at risk of drowning if they are pulled overboard. Best practices have been developed to prevent and reduce entanglement, and to facilitate getting fishermen who have fallen overboard back onto their vessels.

Rope-less lobster traps

As whales can get entangled in ropes, there is currently research going on into development of rope-less lobster traps. Some designs have already been developed.

See also
 Lobster fishing
 Lobster hook
 Crab trap
 Krusty Krab, a fictional fast food restaurant, styled on the shape of a lobster trap

References

External links

American inventions
Fishing equipment
Lobster fishing